Anatrachyntis amphisaris is a moth in the family Cosmopterigidae. It was described by Edward Meyrick in 1922, and is known from Sri Lanka.

This species has a wingspan of 10mm. The forewings are light pinkish-ochreous irregularly irrorated with blackish-grey; a transverse whitish streak at 1/4 preceded with blackish irrorations,  a triangular dorsal blotch in the wing, outlined with ochreous-whitish suffusion.

References

Moths described in 1922
Anatrachyntis
Moths of Sri Lanka